Haliotinella patinaria is a species of predatory sea snail, a marine gastropod mollusk in the family Naticidae, the moon snails.

Distribution
This marine species occurs in the West Indies, off Saint Kitts; also off Trinidad.

Description 
The maximum recorded shell length varies between 16 m mm and 18 mm.

Habitat 
It has a minimum recorded depth is 0 m. Maximum recorded depth is 80 m.

References

 Guppy, R.J.L., 1876. Sur l'existence du genre Haliotinella aux Antilles. Journal de Conchyliologie 24: 161-163
 Guppy, R.J.L., 1878. Note sur l'Haliotinella patinaria et sur quelques autres Mollusques des Antilles. Journal de Conchyliologie 26: 321-325
 Fischer-Piette, E., 1950. Liste des types décrits dans le Journal de Conchyliologie et conservés dans la collection de ce journal (avec planches)(suite). Journal de Conchyliologie 90: 149-180

External links
 Watson, R. B. (1897). On the marine Mollusca of Madeira; with descriptions of thirty-five new species, and an index-list of all the known sea-dwelling species of that island. Journal of the Linnean Society of London, Zoology. 26(19): 233-329, pl. 19-20
 G.; Moretzsohn, F.; García, E. F. (2009). Gastropoda (Mollusca) of the Gulf of Mexico, Pp. 579–699 in: Felder, D.L. and D.K. Camp (eds.), Gulf of Mexico–Origins, Waters, and Biota. Texas A&M Press, College Station, Texas

Naticidae
Gastropods described in 1876